Charles Luca (born Charles Gastaut) was the founder of the Phalange Française (French for French Falange). Luca was the cousin of French fascist leader Marcel Déat.

References 

Falangist politicians
French politicians
Year of birth missing
Year of death missing